Chlorophytum tuberosum is a species of flowering plant in the Asparagaceae family. It is one of several species known by the common name musli. It is native to parts of Africa and India. It has historical uses in Ayurveda.

References

External links
Aluka Profile
Article on Muslis

Agavoideae
Taxa named by William Roxburgh